"I" (stylized as "i") is a song by American rapper Lil Skies, released as the second single from his debut studio album Shelby on March 1, 2019. The track reminisces on Skies' past experiences with love and personal struggles among other memories.

Music video 
On February 28, 2019, Cole Bennett uploaded the music video for "I" on his YouTube account. The music video currently has over 95 million views as of July 2022.

Charts

Weekly charts

Year-end charts

Certifications

References

2019 songs
2019 singles
Atlantic Records singles
Lil Skies songs
Songs written by Kevin Gomringer
Songs written by Tim Gomringer
Songs written by Lil Skies

Song recordings produced by Cubeatz